Ananda Thandavam is a 2009 Tamil-language romantic drama film, an adaptation of Sujatha's serialized novel Pirivom Santhippom. The film was directed by A. R. Gandhi Krishna and produced by Oscar V. Ravichandran of Aascar Films. The music was composed by G. V. Prakash Kumar with editing by V. T. Vijayan and cinematography by Jeeva Shankar.

The film stars Siddharth Venugopal, Tamannaah, Rukmini Vijayakumar, and Rishi. The characters Raghu (Siddharth) and Madhu (Tamannaah): their love story captured so many hearts that Sujatha, who had initially finished the first novel, started the second part due to high demand from readers.

The film was released on 10 April 2009 to negative reviews and became a commercial failure at the box office. But over the years it has achieved cult status owing to the success of Pirivom Santhippom.

Plot
The film deals with the life of Raghupathi (Siddharth Venugopal), whose mother died in childbirth. He grows up with plenty of affection from his father (Kitty) and grows into a quiet, sensible, and a bit of a serious person. His father is a government employed deputy-chief engineer in the Ambasamudram dam, Tirunelveli, while Raghu is also a mechanical engineer. However, he is frustrated because he is unemployed. One day, after returning after an interview in Pune, he meets Madhumitha (Tamannaah). A naive character, she plays childish pranks and brings energy into his life. Madhu is the elder daughter of the dam's new chief engineer and his arrogant wife, who want a very comfortable life for the family.

Madhu's parents also bring joy in Raghu's life as they accept who he is, and eventually, he finds good employment in Pune. He suddenly gets engaged to Madhu, even without pre-informing his father. Raghu leaves to work, for Pune. When he returns a month later, trouble had come in the form of 'Rad' Radhakrishnan (Rishi), a spoilt NRI businessman from the United States who was on vacation to Papanasam. Rad had seen Madhu and was enticed by her beauty and her parents' wealth and made a proposal to her parents. Seeing a better life for Madhu, her parents agreed to cancel Raghu's engagement. Worst of all, Madhu, being immature herself, agreed with her parents' opinion and decided to marry Rad. The fake reason given by Madhu's family is that Raghu's father has an illicit relationship with their maid Jayanthi, who is just a year older than Raghu. Jayanthi, having a baby from a husband who left her, also clouds Raghu's judgement. Moreover, when Raghu asks for Madhu to elope with him, she agrees to it, but cancels it at the last hour stating the same reason. Raghu, heartbroken, attempts to commit suicide by jumping down a waterfall. He survives it with temporary injuries. His father berates him and says that Jayanthi's mother breast-fed him, and she is like his own daughter. He took care of Jayanthi just because her husband left her pregnant. Also, Madhu had visited him while he was in a coma. She had already married and left to the US with Rad. Six months later, with further encouragement from his father and friends, Raghu leaves for New York City to get his MBA at NYU. He has to stay in the mansion of Mohanram (Rama Natarajan), his father's childhood friend. Mohan is a rich divorcee and successful online share-trader.

Raghu is received by Mohan's niece Ratnakumari (Rukmini Vijayakumar) at the airport, and she drops him home. Ratna, though being brought up in the USA since the age of seven, wants to marry an Indian man and return to India. She is extremely intelligent, beautiful, social, and cultured. Raghu starts his MBA course and befriends another Tamil guy named Natraj. However, at the end of the day, Raghu's benchmate, a Korean, kills his ex-girlfriend and then himself before Raghu's eyes. Then, a mob tries to mug Raghu, but Ratna saves him. Raghu then asks Mohan to put him back on the next flight home. Mohan says that he cut his own left leg to escape from the Twin Towers on 9/11. His company fired him and provided compensation, which was taken away by his wife as a divorce settlement. Still, he did online share trading and has earned around $20 million in 10 years. He shows his hidden prosthetic leg and then says that Raghu's father has spent his life's savings to send Raghu to New York. This motivates Raghu to stay in New York.

Weeks later, Raghu sees Madhu in a Tamil association function. Madhu reconciles with Raghu and gifts Raghu with an iPhone 4. Also, both go on a trio-trip to Atlantic City after Rad cancels last-minute. While coming back home, Madhu drops Raghu at her home and leaves to buy groceries. There, Raghu is shocked to find that Rad has been cheating on Madhu. He resolves to tell her the truth, but Madhu is blinded against Rad's faults because of respect for him. She accuses him of still having feelings for her, insulting him and causing another argument between them. Months pass by, Raghu and Ratna become close, and their families decide to get them engaged. As time progresses, Madhu discovers that her husband has been cheating on her, which had let her to be on constant abuse by him, leading her to live life with misery.  One day, Madhu escapes from Rad and goes to meet Raghu. Unfortunately for her, Raghu gets engaged to Ratna the very same day. Unable to bear any more sadness, Madhu ends up cutting her veins and begging Raghu to take her back. Ratna intervenes, and Madhu asks for Raghu. Ratna is disgusted and complains to her family. They come and take Raghu away, leaving Madhu devastated, drunk, and bleeding through her veins. Madhu then kills herself through reckless driving.

At the airport, everyone is gathered, and Madhu's parents are collecting the coffin with Madhu's body. Rad tries to lie to Madhu's parents that he was perfect to her in every way and cannot understand why this happened. In the meantime, Raghu, who had also come to see Madhu's body, arrives. He gets enraged and charges at Rad with a security's revolver, but he then finds out that it is locked. Madhu's parents apologize to Raghu that their daughter's death was caused by their own greed and betrayal, and take Madhu's body to India. Outside the airport, Raghu is consoled by Ratna as she tells him that she loves his relationship commitment more than him.

Cast

 Siddharth Venugopal as Raghupathi
 Tamannaah as Madhumitha
 Rukmini Vijayakumar as Ratnakumari
 Rishi as Radhakrishnan 
 Kitty as Raghu's father
 Tirlok Malik as Hindu Priest
 Rama Natarajan as Mohanram
 Aditi Sriram as Mohanram's first child
 Sanchaya Satish as Mohanram's second child
 Sanjana Satish as Mohanram's third child
 Raghuram Master as Rathna's father
 Madan Bob
 Charle
 Ammu Ramachandran
 Kalairani
 Srinath
 Bala Singh
 Five Star Krishna
 Ann Marie Seall as Jennifer
 Kaveh as Police Officer

Production notes
A. R. Gandhi Krishna, a former assistant to Shankar in Sivaji made his directorial debut with the film Chellamae. Sujatha wrote the dialogue for the screenplay before his death. Filming began on location in Ooty, then moved to Tenkasi, Kuttralam, Ambasamudram, Papanasam and Malaysia. G. V. Prakash scored the music for the movie, while award-winning lyricist Vairamuthu penned the lyrics. Vairamuthu said that one of his best recent works was the song he wrote for this film. Vairamuthu said, "On reading the lines, Gandhi Krishna was floored totally and was in fail of words". Ananda Thandavam was produced by Aascar Films' Suresh Shanmugam. Shankar, who worked as associate to the late cinematographer Jeeva, was "cranking the camera".

The satellite rights of the film were sold to Kalaignar TV.

Soundtrack
The songs were composed by G. V. Prakash Kumar in which 'Kana Kangiren' song become Massive response from audience and one of the top listening songs of the year. All lyrics written by Vairamuthu.

Critical reception
Sify.com says that the actor "can do little to save the film". Rediff.com felt that Siddharth's performance was one of the weaker aspects of the film noting "though he does his best when he's romancing his beloved, and there are sparks during emotional scenes, he seems to miss his cue a few times, making you wonder if someone with acting chops might not have done a better job."

References

External links
 
 Prasad Kovilkar, 
 S.R. Ashok Kumar,Hindu.com, 10 May 2008, "Sujatha’s novel on the big screen"

2009 films
2000s Tamil-language films
2009 romantic drama films
Indian romantic drama films
Films scored by G. V. Prakash Kumar
Films based on Indian novels
Indian films set in New York City